Egeria is an unincorporated community in Mercer and Raleigh counties, West Virginia, United States. The 1881 guide to the Chesapeake and Ohio Railway lists a blacksmith, two cabinetmakers or undertakers, a general store, a machinist, corn or flour mill, sawmill, and nine "principal farmers". 

The community had a post office as of 1955. The Egeria high school, which was built in 1913, was the last single-teacher high school in West Virginia. It had 21 total students at its peak, and enrollment numbers were usually in the teens, making it the smallest school in the county; in 1954 it had only two graduates. At the time, the community was cut off from surrounding towns by poor quality roads, which slowed local progress and led younger residents to move away.

References

Unincorporated communities in Mercer County, West Virginia
Unincorporated communities in Raleigh County, West Virginia
Unincorporated communities in West Virginia